The Half Sisters is a 2014 Philippine television drama romantic series broadcast by GMA Network. It premiered on the network's Afternoon Prime line up from June 9, 2014, to January 15, 2016, replacing Villa Quintana.

Mega Manila ratings are provided by AGB Nielsen Philippines. The series ended, but its the 84th-week run, and with 418 episodes. It was replaced by Wish I May.

Series overview
The series was originally set to air for 13 weeks. However, due to high ratings and feedback from viewers, the network decided to extend its run until January 2016. It was hailed as the network's longest running series for 2010's.

Episodes

June 2014

July 2014

August 2014

September 2014

October 2014

November 2014

December 2014

January 2015

February 2015

March 2015

April 2015

May 2015

June 2015

July 2015

August 2015

September 2015

October 2015

November 2015

December 2015

January 2016

References

Lists of Philippine drama television series episodes